Aburrow is a surname of English origin. People with this surname include:

 Edward Aburrow Sr., English cricketer
 Edward "Curry" Aburrow (1747–1835), English cricketer

References